Tofogliflozin (INN, USAN, codenamed CSG452) is an experimental drug for the treatment of diabetes mellitus and is being developed by Chugai Pharma in collaboration with Kowa and Sanofi. It is an inhibitor of subtype 2 sodium-glucose transport protein (SGLT2), which is responsible for at least 90% of the glucose reabsorption in the kidney. , the drug is in Phase III clinical trials.

Chemistry

The active moiety or anhydrous form (ChemSpider ID: 28530778, CHEMBL2110731) has the chemical formula C22H26O6 and a molecular mass of 386.44 g/mol.

The United States Adopted Name tofogliflozin applies to the monohydrate, which is the form used as a drug. The International Nonproprietary Name tofogliflozin applies to the anhydrous compound and the drug form is referred to as tofogliflozin hydrate.

See also 
 Gliflozin

References 

SGLT2 inhibitors
Glucosides
Spiro compounds
Isobenzofurans